Corby is a constituency in Northamptonshire represented in the House of Commons of the UK Parliament since May 2015 by Tom Pursglove of the Conservative Party.

History
The seat was created due to population increases in the county for the 1983 general election.  Since creation it has been a marginal seat alternating between Labour and the Conservative representatives with marginal majorities relative to national averages on all but two occasions, the 1997 Labour landslide and the 2012 by-election.  The first Member of Parliament elected for the constituency in 1983 was William Powell, who represented the Conservatives for three sessions of Parliament until 1997.  Labour then held the seat until 2010. On 6 August 2012, MP for the seat since 2010 Louise Mensch (formerly Louise Bagshawe) announced she was resigning, triggering a by-election held on 15 November 2012. Labour's Andy Sawford won, becoming the first Labour MP for the seat since Phil Hope was defeated in 2010, and only the second in the seat's history. This was  Labour's first by-election win from a Conservative since the 1997 Wirral South by-election.  At the 2015 general election Tom Pursglove standing for the Conservatives won with a small majority.  He won again with a similar margin in 2017 and in 2019 Tom Pursglove took the seat for the third time, but with a majority of over 10,000, turning Corby into a non-marginal seat by Conservative Party standards.

Boundaries

1983–2010: The District of Corby, and the District of East Northamptonshire wards of Barnwell, Brigstock, Drayton, Forest, Irthlingborough, King's Cliffe, Lower Nene, Margaret Beaufort, Oundle, Raunds, Ringstead, Stanwick, Thrapston, Willibrook, and Woodford.

2010–present: The Borough of Corby, and the District of East Northamptonshire wards of Barnwell, Dryden, Fineshade, Irthlingborough, King's Forest, Lower Nene, Lyveden, Oundle, Prebendal, Raunds Saxon, Raunds Windmill, Ringstead, Stanwick, Thrapston, and Woodford.

The constituency was created in 1983 from parts of the seats of Kettering and Wellingborough. It is named after the town of Corby in Northamptonshire, and also covers much of the local government district of East Northamptonshire, but excluding Rushden and Higham Ferrers which are in the Wellingborough constituency. . The seat is a highly marginal contest between the Tories and Labour, with Labour's vote strongest in the town of Corby itself, against the solidly Conservative rural areas of East Northamptonshire.

The constituency is sometimes informally called "Corby and East Northamptonshire", but the Parliamentary Constituencies Order and Whitaker's Almanack both make it clear that its official name is "Corby".

Members of Parliament

Elections

Elections in the 2010s

Elections in the 2000s

Elections in the 1990s

Elections in the 1980s

See also
 List of parliamentary constituencies in Northamptonshire

Notes

References

Corby
North Northamptonshire
Parliamentary constituencies in Northamptonshire
Constituencies of the Parliament of the United Kingdom established in 1983